Estadio La Rosaleda (literally The Rose Garden) is a football stadium in the city of Málaga, in Andalucia, southern Spain. It is the home stadium of Málaga CF in Segunda División and was previously that of the Club Deportivo Málaga, of which Málaga CF is heir. The subsidiary Atlético Malagueño also used it as a habitual pitch during his time in the second division. The Costa del Sol Trophy Cup, organized annually by the Málaga Football Club together with the Municipality of Málaga, is held in this stadium. With a capacity of 30,044 seats, it is the 18th-largest stadium in Spain and the 4th-largest in Andalusia.

This replaced the football field Málaga historic arena of Baños del Carmen. When it flooded, the rose garden had to be used for the first time on 13 April 1941 with a fixture between the CD Málaga and AD Ferroviaria. However, the official inauguration took place on 14 September 1941, with a friendly match between the CD Málaga and Sevilla. In this match, CD Málaga also premiered name since its previous name was CD Malacitano.

Notable events 
The Rosaleda Stadium was one of the seventeen host stadiums of the 1982 FIFA World Cup, hosting three matches. Throughout its history, it has also hosted seven matches of the Spain national team and two friendly matches, one of those matches involving the Andalusia national team.

In 2009, Andalusia became host of the Peace Cup, and Málaga was selected as a host city. La Rosaleda was host to four matches of the 2009 Peace Cup, including the semi-final between Porto and Aston Villa.

In 2020, the stadium was elected for hosting the women's Copa de la Reina.

European Matches 
The stadium hosted a party at European level for the first time in 1976 for a knockout stage match in the UEFA Champions League between Real Madrid and Club Brugge due to a penalty issued UEFA to Real Madrid's Santiago Bernabéu Stadium.

In summer 2002, it hosted several matches and one of the finals of the UEFA Intertoto Cup, which was awarded the Málaga and allowed to continue to play matches in the 2002–03 season of the UEFA Cup quarter-final until when was eliminated.

Charity Matches 
Other events included the celebration of "V Match Against Poverty" in November 2007, which pitted teams from the Friends of Zidane and Friends of Ronaldo. In March 2009 was played in a charity match The Rose Garden where he raised 24,000 euros for the benefit of those affected by the tornado of Málaga between the city's football club and a team of former players, active or retired, called "Legends Malagua" and headed by former coach Joaquín Peiró. In June of that year, the Foundation 442 Will Atkinson organized a benefit match between players and former players of the League in order to raise funds for a football school in the city.

The Rosaleda Stadium has been one of the headquarters of the Peace Cup in 2009, hosting the matches: Málaga - Aston Villa (1-0), Málaga - CF Atlante (1-3), Aston Villa - CF Atlante (3-1 ) and Aston Villa - Porto (2-1).

Concerts 
The stadium has also seen several concerts as George Michael with 62,000 spectators, Shakira with  59,000 spectators, Maná with 55,000 spectators, Alejandro Sanz with 56,000 spectators, and RBD with 60,000.

Ownership 
The stadium is owned by the municipality of Málaga, the Málaga Provincial Council and the Government of Andalusia in equal shares (33.33%), after the CD Málaga be expropriated because of the debt that crossed before her disappearance. The owners, apart from the grant that has the Málaga CF, organize other events in this forum, especially concerts.

Renovation 
In 2000, the stadium underwent renovation that was completed in 2006, being reopened with the XXIV edition of the Trofeo Costa del Sol. Completed, the capacity of the stadium is 30,044 all seated locations, paths visors on the steps of Grandstand and Preference, closed circuit television, private boxes, press boxes, outings to area Guadalmedina river and other amenities that the stadium was suing to conform to safety regulations of the LFP. The renovation project was conducted by the architect José Segui Pérez and Sando-Vera joint venture.

Sporting Activities 
The stadium facilities hosting the Rosaleda Official Store Málaga CF and a medical center clinics belonging to Corner. Meanwhile, the club works for a future installation of a museum of history of the equipment being stand at the lowest tier of Gol.

1982 FIFA World Cup 
The stadium was one of the venues of the 1982 FIFA World Cup, and held the following matches:

References

External links

La Rosaleda History in Pictures 
La Rosaleda Stadium
Estadios de España 

 

Rosaleda
Málaga CF
1982 FIFA World Cup stadiums
Buildings and structures in Málaga
Sports venues completed in 1941